The Morse potential, named after physicist Philip M. Morse, is a convenient 
interatomic interaction model for the potential energy of a diatomic molecule. It is a better approximation for the vibrational structure of the molecule than the quantum harmonic oscillator because it explicitly includes the effects of bond breaking, such as the existence of unbound states. It also accounts for the anharmonicity of real bonds and the non-zero transition probability for overtone and combination bands. The Morse potential can also be used to model other interactions such as the interaction between an atom and a surface. Due to its simplicity (only three fitting parameters), it is not used in modern spectroscopy. However, its mathematical form inspired the MLR (Morse/Long-range) potential, which is the most popular potential energy function used for fitting spectroscopic data.

Potential energy function

The Morse potential energy function is of the form

Here  is the distance between the atoms,  is the equilibrium bond distance,  is the well depth (defined relative to the dissociated atoms), and  controls the 'width' of the potential (the smaller  is, the larger the well). The dissociation energy of the bond can be calculated by subtracting the zero point energy  from the depth of the well.

where  is the force constant at the minimum of the well.

Since the zero of potential energy is arbitrary, the equation for the Morse potential can be rewritten any number of ways by adding or subtracting a constant value. When it is used to model the atom-surface interaction, the energy zero can be redefined so that the Morse potential becomes

which is usually written as

where  is now the coordinate perpendicular to the surface. This form approaches zero at infinite  and equals  at its minimum, i.e. . It clearly shows that the Morse potential is the combination of a short-range repulsion term (the former) and a long-range attractive term (the latter), analogous to the Lennard-Jones potential.

Vibrational states and energies

Like the quantum harmonic oscillator, the energies and eigenstates of the Morse potential can be found using operator methods.
One approach involves applying the factorization method to the Hamiltonian.

it is convenient to introduce the new variables:

Then, the Schrödinger equation takes the simple form:

Its eigenvalues and eigenstates can be written as:

where

with [x] denoting the largest integer smaller than x.

where

There also exists the following analytical expression for matrix elements of the coordinate operator:

The eigenenergies in the initial variables have the form:

where  is the vibrational quantum number and  has units of frequency. The latter is mathematically related to the particle mass, and the Morse constants via

Mathematically, the spacing of Morse levels is

This trend matches the anharmonicity found in real molecules. However, this equation fails above some value of  where  is calculated to be zero or negative. Specifically,

 integer part.

This failure is due to the finite number of bound levels in the Morse potential, and some maximum  that remains bound.

Below ,  is a good approximation for the true vibrational structure in non-rotating diatomic molecules.  In fact, the real molecular spectra are generally fit to the form1

in which the constants  and  can be directly related to the parameters for the Morse potential.

Morse/Long-range potential 

An extension of the Morse potential that made the Morse form useful for modern (high-resolution) spectroscopy is the MLR (Morse/Long-range) potential. The MLR potential is used as a standard for representing spectroscopic and/or virial data of diatomic molecules by a potential energy curve. It has been used on N2, Ca2, KLi, MgH, several electronic states of Li2, Cs2, Sr2, ArXe, LiCa, LiNa, Br2, Mg2, HF, HCl, HBr, HI, MgD, Be2, BeH, and NaH.  More sophisticated versions are used for polyatomic molecules.

See also
Lennard-Jones potential
Molecular mechanics

References
1 CRC Handbook of chemistry and physics, Ed David R. Lide, 87th ed, Section 9, SPECTROSCOPIC CONSTANTS OF DIATOMIC MOLECULES pp. 9–82
 
 
 
 
 
 
 
 I.G. Kaplan, in Handbook of Molecular Physics and Quantum Chemistry, Wiley, 2003, p207.

Chemical bonding
Quantum chemistry
Quantum models
Quantum mechanical potentials